The 2015 Guangzhou Evergrande Taobao season is the 62nd year in Guangzhou Evergrande's existence and is its 48th season in the Chinese football league, also its 26th season in the top flight. The club's name was changed from Guangzhou Evergrande F.C. to Guangzhou Evergrande Taobao F.C. before the 2015 season due to e-commerce company Alibaba Group purchasing a 50% stake in the club from the Evergrande Real Estate Group. Fabio Cannavaro was appointed as the new manager of the club after Marcello Lippi announced his retirement at the end of 2014 season. On 4 June 2015, Brazilian football manager Luiz Felipe Scolari was appointed as the new manager of club, signing a two-and-a-half-year deal.

Players

First and reserve squad

On loan

Technical staff

Transfers

In

Winter

Summer

Out

Winter

Summer

Pre-season and friendlies

Training matches

2015 Casino Marbella Cup

FC Bayern München China Tour

Competitions

Chinese Super League

Table

Results summary

Results by round

Matches

Chinese FA Cup

Chinese FA Super Cup

AFC Champions League

Group stage

Knockout stage

Round of 16

Quarter-finals

Semi-finals

Final

FIFA Club World Cup

Statistics

Appearances and goals

Goalscorers

Assists

Disciplinary record

Notes and references

Guangzhou F.C.
Guangzhou F.C. seasons